Wang Dawei (born April 1964) is a former Chinese politician who served as vice governor of Liaoning from 2017 to 2022. He was investigated by China's top anti-graft agency in March 2022.

Early life and education
Wang was born in Wangkui County, Heilongjiang, in April 1964. In 1983, he was accepted to Northeast Forestry University, majoring in logging engineering.

Career
Wang joined the Chinese Communist Party (CCP) in December 1984. In 1990, he worked in the State Forestry Investment Corporation after university. In January 1992, he was assigned to the State Economic and Trade Commission (now National Development and Reform Commission), where he worked until 1998.

In June 2001, he was transferred to his home-province Heilongjiang and appointed vice mayor of Harbin, capital of the province. He was appointed secretary of the Harbin Municipal Political and Legal Affairs Commission in January 2007 and was admitted to member of the standing committee of the CCP Harbin Municipal Committee, the city's top authority. In August 2009, he was made deputy head of Heilongjiang Provincial Public Security Department.

In March 2013, he was promoted to become head of Liaoning Provincial Public Security Department, concurrently serving as vice governor of Liaoning since February 2017.

Downfall
On 1 March 2022, Wang was put under investigation for alleged "serious violations of discipline and laws" by the Central Commission for Discipline Inspection (CCDI), the party's internal disciplinary body, and the National Supervisory Commission, the highest anti-corruption agency of China. He is the fourth head of Liaoning Provincial Public Security Department and the eleventh police chief in China caught since the crackdown was launched in 2012, after , Li Wenxi and Xue Heng.

References

1964 births
Living people
People from Wangkui County
Northeast Forestry University alumni
Harbin Institute of Technology alumni
People's Republic of China politicians from Liaoning
Chinese Communist Party politicians from Liaoning